Arcade is an album by jazz guitarist John Abercrombie that was released by ECM in 1979.

Reception
The Allmusic review gave the album three stars.

Track listing

Personnel
 John Abercrombie – guitar, electric mandolin
 Richie Beirach – piano
 George Mraz – double bass
 Peter Donald – drums

References

ECM Records albums
John Abercrombie (guitarist) albums
1979 albums
Albums produced by Manfred Eicher